Oxypetalum is a genus of flowering plants in the family Apocynaceae, first described with this name in 1810. The genus is native to South America.

Oxypetalum coeruleum is cultivated as an ornamental.

Species

formerly included
moved to other genera (Calostigma, Cynanchum, Gothofreda, Morrenia, Philibertia, Tassadia, Tweedia)

References

Asclepiadoideae
Apocynaceae genera
Flora of South America